In enzymology, a cellobiose phosphorylase is an enzyme that catalyzes the chemical reaction

cellobiose + phosphate  alpha-D-glucose 1-phosphate + D-glucose

Thus, the two substrates of this enzyme are cellobiose and phosphate, whereas its two products are alpha-D-glucose 1-phosphate and D-glucose.

This enzyme belongs to the family of glycosyltransferases, specifically the hexosyltransferases.  The systematic name of this enzyme class is cellobiose:phosphate alpha-D-glucosyltransferase. This enzyme participates in starch and sucrose metabolism.

Structural studies

References 

 
 

EC 2.4.1
Enzymes of known structure